Coleothrix crassitibiella is a species of snout moth in the genus Coleothrix. It was described by Ragonot in 1888. It is found in China (Hainan), Borneo and Sumatra.

References

Moths described in 1888
Phycitinae